Ali Husni Faisal (born 23 May 1994), is an Iraqi footballer who plays as a winger for Al-Shorta and the Iraqi national team. He played at the 2016 Rio Olympics for Iraq. In 2016 he signed for Turkish club Caykur Rizespor before personal issues caused the contract to be terminated and he returned to his boyhood club Al-Minaa.

Club career

Al Minaa

Ali Husni Faisal was born in 1994 and progressed through the youth ranks of Al-Minaa. Ali started his career at his hometown club Al-Minaa, the biggest club in the city of Basra under the supervision of Mohammed Abdul-Hussein. In 2012, he was named the player of the tournament at the Iraq School Championship and lifted the cup for the Basra Tarbiya XI, with a 5-1 victory over Baghdad Al-Karkh XI.
He was part of the club's academy and broke into the first team in 2012.

He quickly established himself at Al-Minaa becoming a fan favourite and an important part of the club. He was the club's star player and scored and assisted in most matches. He played most of his games on the right midfield where he scored 18 goals in 85 league appearances over a span of 5 years. He has also played on the left wing and down the middle as an attacking midfielder.

At the start of the 2012-2013 season, the attacking midfield star had spent most of the early season on the sidelines with severe stomach pains and suffering from anaemia, a decrease of red blood cells in his blood, which threatened his future in the game. Many at the club believed his football career was over.

While gaining a call-up to the youth team, the star of Ghazi Fahad’s youthful side has already caught the eye of the national coach Vladimir Petrović in 2013, according to the player, however he did not feel the time was right for him to make that step-up to the seniors.

″“The national team masseur Abu Abdullah once told me that Petrović admired me, and it was very likely that I would be one of his selections, but in the future, I don’t currently feel that I’m ready to play for the national side. The reason is that I have not played for the nasheen (Under 17s), or the Shabab (Under 20s) and it is difficult to go directly and play for the national team.″”

Failed transfer to Çaykur Rizespor 

Ali was announced by Turkish top flight club Caykur Rizespor ahead of the 2016/17 Super Lig Season. A few weeks after signing the contract, however, his deal was terminated due to personal reasons and disagreements over promises which were broken by the club. After his contract was terminated, he returned to Al-Minaa.

Al Arabi 

Ali signed for Kuwaiti side Al Arabi on a 6-month deal on January 26, 2017. This made him the first Iraqi to play in Kuwait since 1991. He made his debut on February 2, 2017 in an Emir cup match Vs Al-Salmiya as a first-half substitute, coming on the field in the 41st minute. He assisted the only goal scored by his team as the match ended 1-1. He made 15 league appearances over the coming months.

Return to Al Minaa

Ali returned on August 20, 2017, having received his clearance to play hours before the match. Ali came on as a second half substitute in the second half of the Iraq FA Cup semifinals against Naft Al-Wasat, and he scored on the 68th minute.

International career

Iraq National Team
The lively winger had long been touted as the future star of Iraq’s midfield but was continuingly ignored by former national coach Hakim Shaker, in what seemed to have been a personal grudge against him for his public outburst after he was dropped from the 2013 FIFA U-20 World Cup squad. He would eventually make his senior international debut in the last minutes of a friendly game against North Korea national team on 21 February 2014 but was overlooked by the same coach for the Asian Games in Busan and the Gulf Cup in Saudi Arabia.
Radhi Shenaishil, the Iraqi manager at the time, called Ali up as part of the squad for the 2015 AFC Asian Cup. Iraq eventually finished fourth in the tournament. Ali scored his first ever international goal against Chinese Taipei in the 2018 FIFA World Cup qualification. Ali scored in back to back games, both off the bench, in the Arabian Gulf Cup.

Iraq U-23
Ali was instrumental in Iraq winning the Bronze medal in the 2016 AFC U-23 Championship and their subsequent qualification to the 2016 Rio Olympics. Ali scored 2 goals in the U-23 Championship, including the equalizer against the UAE in the quarterfinal which took Iraq to extra time and gave them a 3-1 win. He also got an assist, and positive attacking play made him one of the stars of the tournament.

Iraq national team goals
Scores and results list Iraq's goal tally first.

Honours

Club
Al-Quwa Al-Jawiya
 AFC Cup: 2018
Al-Shorta
 Iraqi Premier League: 2021–22
 Iraqi Super Cup: 2022

International
 4th Place in the 2015 AFC Asian Cup
 3rd Place in the 2016 AFC U-23 Championship

References

External links
 
 

Living people
1994 births
Iraqi footballers
Iraq international footballers
Association football wingers
Sportspeople from Basra
Al-Mina'a SC players
Al-Shorta SC players
People from Basra
2015 AFC Asian Cup players
2019 AFC Asian Cup players
Footballers at the 2016 Summer Olympics
Olympic footballers of Iraq
Al-Arabi SC (Kuwait) players
AFC Cup winning players
Kuwait Premier League players
Iraqi expatriate sportspeople in Kuwait
Expatriate footballers in Kuwait
Çaykur Rizespor footballers
Expatriate footballers in Turkey
Iraqi expatriate sportspeople in Turkey
Al-Quwa Al-Jawiya players